A referendum on autonomy was held in Guadeloupe on 7 December 2003. Voters were asked whether they wanted the island to become a territorial collectivity, which would have given the regional government more autonomy. The proposal was rejected by 73% of voters.

In simultaneous referendums, Saint Martin and Saint Barthélemy both voted to become overseas collectivities, gaining autonomy from Guadeloupe.

Results

References

2003 referendums
Autonomy referendums
Referendums in Guadeloupe
Referendums in Saint Martin
Referendums in Saint Barthélemy
2003 in Guadeloupe